Niabella tibetensis is a Gram-negative, rod-shaped and non-motile bacterium from the genus of Niabella which has been isolated from the Tibet Province in China.

References

Chitinophagia
Bacteria described in 2011